Ranko Golijanin (born 18 January 1975) is a retired professional footballer who played in the First League of FR Yugoslavia, Segunda División, USL A-League, and the Canadian Soccer League.

Club career
After spending most of his career in Serbia with FK Zemun and FK Radnički Kragujevac, he had spells in Spain, with Hércules CF, and at the end of his career, in the United States, with Milwaukee Rampage. In 2010, he went overseas to Canada to sign with  Brantford Galaxy SC of the Canadian Soccer League. He made his debut on 23 May 2010 against Toronto Croatia, and recorded his first goal in a 2–1 victory. He helped Brantford clinch a postseason berth by finishing seventh in the overall standings. He netted a hat-trick against Portugal FC in the Semi-final's to book Brantford  a spot in the 2010 CSL Championship with a 5–3 victory. He featured in the CSL Championship match against Hamilton Croatia, where he recorded a goal in a 3–0 clinching the club's first championship.

In 2012, he signed with London City. On 1 August 2012 he returned to Brantford in the role of player/assistant coach. In 2013, he was reunited with head coach Lazo Džepina and secured a contract with SC Waterloo Region. During his tenure with Waterloo the club qualified for the playoffs by finishing fifth in the overall standings. He featured in the CSL Championship match against Kingston FC, and won his second championship by a score of 3–1. In 2015, he helped Waterloo reach their second CSL Championship finals, where they faced Toronto Croatia but suffered a 1–0 defeat.

Honours
Milwaukee Rampage
 USL A-League: 2002
Brantford Galaxy
 CSL Championship: 2010
SC Waterloo
 CSL Championship: 2013

References

External sources

 

1975 births
Living people
People from Pale, Bosnia and Herzegovina
Association football midfielders
Yugoslav footballers
Bosnia and Herzegovina footballers
Serbia and Montenegro footballers
Serbian footballers
FK Zemun players
FK Radnički 1923 players
OFK Beograd players
Hércules CF players
Milwaukee Rampage players
Brantford Galaxy players
London City players
SC Waterloo Region players
Yugoslav First League players
Second League of Serbia and Montenegro players
Segunda División players
First League of Serbia and Montenegro players
A-League (1995–2004) players
Canadian Soccer League (1998–present) players
Serbia and Montenegro expatriate footballers
Expatriate footballers in Spain
Serbia and Montenegro expatriate sportspeople in Spain
Expatriate soccer players in the United States
Serbia and Montenegro expatriate sportspeople in the United States
Serbian expatriate footballers
Expatriate soccer players in Canada
Serbian expatriate sportspeople in Canada